Metro is an Italian free daily newspaper published in Italy.

History and profile
Metro is published by Metro International. Ten separate editions are produced for the cities of Bergamo, Bologna, Genoa, Florence, Milan, Padua, Rome, Turin, Venice and Verona, with other special editions (Metro Mag, Metro Stadio, Metro Week).

It is the most read free daily newspaper in Rome and Milan and one of the most read nationally. It is also one of two major free newspapers in Italy, the other being Leggo. In the period of 2001-2002 Metro had a circulation of 414,000 copies. In 2012 the circulation of the paper was 1,463,000 copies.

It also features the Get Fuzzy comic strip, translated into Italian.

References

External links
 Metro (Italy), official website 

2001 establishments in Italy
Publications established in 2001
Free daily newspapers
Italian-language newspapers
Newspapers published in Milan
Newspapers published in Turin
Newspapers published in Rome
Newspapers published in Florence
Culture in Genoa
Daily newspapers published in Italy